The 1899 Georgetown Blue and Gray football team represented Georgetown University during the 1898 college football season.  Led by William Fitz Donovan, in his first and only year as head coach, the Blue and Gray had a record of 7–3.

Schedule

References

Georgetown
Georgetown Hoyas football seasons
Georgetown Blue and Gray football